Cupidesthes albida is a butterfly in the family Lycaenidae. It is found in Kinshasa in the Democratic Republic of the Congo.

References

Butterflies described in 1923
Lycaenesthini
Endemic fauna of the Democratic Republic of the Congo